Mark Harris (born April 28, 1970) is a former professional American football player who played wide receiver for five seasons for the San Francisco 49ers.

References

1970 births
American football wide receivers
San Francisco 49ers players
Stanford Cardinal football players
Living people
People from Clovis, New Mexico